The Rhetorical School of Gaza was a group of influential scholars based in Gaza in Late Antiquity (5th–6th centuries), many of whom exhibited a teacher-pupil relationship and participated as orators in local public life. Famous chairs of the school included Aeneas, Procopius, and Choricius. 

Scholarly and rhetorical output of the School at Gaza included traditional Hellenic forms common to the classically educated Christian elite of this era. Among the important collections of writings to have survived are letters which were exchanged in Gaza and also with scholars in Alexandria during this time. 

Historian Nur Masalha argues that the Rhetorical School at Gaza helped turn Byzantine Palaestina into "one of the most important centres of learning and intellectual activity in Late Antiquity," even eclipsing other major cities in the Mediterranean region, namely Athens and Alexandria. He writes that the "soft power" represented by the school and the contemporary Library of Caesarera-Palaestina afforded Palestine a degree of local autonomy in the Byzantine era.

References 
Ancient Greek rhetoricians
Palestine-related articles needing attention

Gaza City
Holy Land during Byzantine rule
5th century in the Byzantine Empire
6th century in the Byzantine Empire